Craig William Heyward (September 26, 1966 – May 27, 2006), nicknamed "Ironhead", was an American professional football player who was a fullback in the National Football League (NFL). He played college football for the Pittsburgh Panthers. He then played for the New Orleans Saints, Chicago Bears, Atlanta Falcons, St. Louis Rams, and Indianapolis Colts in an 11-year NFL career.

Professional career
He was selected by the New Orleans Saints in the first round (24th pick overall) of the 1988 NFL Draft out of the University of Pittsburgh. Heyward's 3,086 career rushing yards rank third all-time at Pitt in only three seasons. He declared himself eligible for the 1988 draft after his junior year. In 1987 at Pittsburgh, Heyward rushed for 1,791 yards to earn consensus All-America honors and finish fifth in the Heisman Trophy balloting.

Heyward was widely regarded as a nightmare for opposing defenses because he was often as big, and sometimes bigger, than the defenders who had to stop him, and had surprising quickness and agility. One of the NFL's best "big man" running backs in the vein of Earl Campbell, Heyward, at 5' 11" and reportedly weighing 330 pounds, was a punishing runner who was also a devastating blocker and good receiver. Heyward slimmed down to closer to 280.

In 1997, Heyward showcased his sense of humor in a series of television commercials for Zest body wash, introducing a generation of American men to the modern version of the Luffa that is now a fixture in many showers and bathtubs. The "lather-builder" and Heyward's tough-guy image created a humorous contrast in the advertisement, culminating in a voting campaign that named it the "thingy".

In November 1998, Heyward reported blurred vision in his right eye, and was diagnosed with a malignant bone cancer, reportedly a chordoma, at the base of his skull that was pressing on the optic nerve. After it was partially removed in a 12-hour operation, he underwent 40 rounds of radiation treatments and was later pronounced cancer-free; the diagnosis nonetheless ended his playing career.

To this day, his 1995 season is the last time a fullback rushed for 1,000 yards.

NFL career statistics

Personal life

Nickname
When Heyward was "12 or 13," according to his son, Cameron Heyward, a defensive lineman for the Pittsburgh Steelers writing for the Players' Tribune, he was at the Boys & Girls Club in Passaic, New Jersey, when another boy approached him and ultimately broke a pool cue over Heyward's head. Heyward barely flinched, and after relating the story later, his grandmother called him "Ironhead," and the nickname stuck.
Heyward carried the nickname through Passaic High School, where it also became a reference to his wild-man strength and the fact that he had to wear a hat size of 8¾. Heyward's obituary in The New York Times made an additional reference; that in street football games he would lower his head into the stomach of the tackler and one opponent said it hurt so much that Heyward's head must be made of iron.

Family
Heyward had four sons named Craig, Jr., Cameron, Corey, and Connor. All four played sports in high school. Craig Jr. played for his father's alma mater in New Jersey while his three brothers played for Peachtree Ridge High School in Georgia.

Heyward's son Cameron plays defensive end for the Pittsburgh Steelers. He played for the Ohio State Buckeyes, where he was named a freshman All-American in 2007 and honored as a team captain. He was drafted by the Steelers in the first round (31st pick overall) in the 2011 NFL Draft. He would write the words "IRON HEAD" on his eye black as a tribute to his father.

Heyward's oldest son, Craig Jr., played high school football for Passaic High School as he did and later was a walk-on at Middle Tennessee State, where he played primarily on special teams. He was signed to the Trenton Steel of the SIFL where he was a running back. After his playing career ended, Heyward Jr. entered coaching as an assistant for Nutley High School in his native northern New Jersey.

Heyward's son Corey graduated from Peachtree Ridge High School and played basketball for Georgia Tech. 

His youngest son, Connor, elected to play college football at Michigan State University in 2017. He was also drafted in the 6th round by the Pittsburgh Steelers in the 2022 NFL Draft.

Cancer and death
Heyward died on May 27, 2006, at the age of 39, a year after another cancerous tumor developed that had metastasized to his brain; the recurrence of the tumor proved to be inoperable. Heyward had also experienced a stroke in the years prior to his death.

See also
 List of college football yearly rushing leaders

References

External links
 
 Pittsburgh Post-Gazette remembrance of Pittsburgh great Craig Heyward
 University of Pittsburgh remembers Ironhead
 ''Seattle Post-Intelligencer "Former fullback Craig "Ironhead" Heyward dies" May 27, 2006 accessed May 28, 2006
 Statistics
 Heyward lived by big heart, By Thomas George, Denver Post Staff Columnist
 Sports E-Cyclopedia's Memoriam to "Ironhead"
 

1966 births
2006 deaths
Players of American football from New Jersey
All-American college football players
American football running backs
Atlanta Falcons players
Chicago Bears players
Deaths from bone cancer
Indianapolis Colts players
National Conference Pro Bowl players
New Orleans Saints players
Passaic High School alumni
Sportspeople from Passaic, New Jersey
Pittsburgh Panthers football players
St. Louis Rams players
Deaths from cancer in Georgia (U.S. state)
Ed Block Courage Award recipients